Tehreek-e-Labbaik Pakistan (TLP) is a far-right Islamic extremist political party in Pakistan. The party was founded by Khadim Hussain Rizvi in August 2015. It became the fifth largest party at the 2018 Pakistani general election, but failed to win any seat in the National Assembly or the Punjab Assembly. However, it was successful in gaining three seats in the Sindh Assembly.

Tehreek-e-Labbaik is known for its protests in opposition to any change to Pakistan's blasphemy law. It demands that Sharia be established as the Islamic fundamental law in Pakistan, through a gradual legal and political process.

Most of the party's members belong to the Barelvi movement and it secured over 2.2 million votes in 2018 elections. Despite being banned, TLP was allowed to contest the elections and secured third place in Karachi by-elections. The party organized the 2021 Pakistani protests.

History 
Tehreek-e-Labbaik was founded on 1 August 2015 by Khadim Hussain Rizvi, at the Nishtar Park in Karachi. Seventy-five founding members pledged allegiance to Khadim Hussain Rizvi. In 2017, The Tehreek-e-Labbaik allotted the crane as its election symbol.

On 23 November 2018, after approval of Federal Cabinet, provincial police carried out an operation and arrested the chief of TLP Khadim Hussain Rizvi, along with some 50 members of his party to defunct the TLP's call for a public rally in Rawalpindi's Liaquat Bagh planned for November 25, 2018, following which protests spread out and situation deteriorated. Pakistan's Federal Minister for Information and Broadcasting confirmed the arrest as a protective custody. Along with media blackout, TLP faced social media and websites bans during the crack down. The TLP leaders Khadim Hussain Rizvi, Pir Afzal Qadri, Inayat Haq Shah, Farooqul Hassan were booked on charges of sedition and terrorism.

Electoral history

Sindh Assembly Elections

National Assembly Elections

Punjab Assembly Elections

List of Ameers

2021 protests

On 12 April 2021, Khadim Hussain Rizvi's son, Saad Hussain Rizvi was arrested by police while he was coming back from a funeral prayer prior to a planned protest by the party on 20 April 2021. The planned protest's motive was to pressure the Government of Pakistan to deport the French ambassador in Pakistan over the controversy of cartoons of the Islamic prophet Muhammad. Over the 3 days long protest in the country, French embassy asked its citizens to temporarily leave the country. The government had arrested him in Lahore and charged under Pakistan's Anti-Terrorism Act, 1997 (ATA), which further angered protesters, causing widespread unrest.

On 14 April 2021, the party was banned, which came after violent protests that caused the deaths of 2 policemen and left 340 injured, in retaliation to the arrest of the new ameer. The interior minister stated that the Punjab government had requested for the ban and the summary after being approved from the federal cabinet resulted in the ban on TLP under the Anti-Terrorism Act 1997. Tehreek-e-Labbaik was banned by the Government of Pakistan on April 15, 2021.

During protests on 18 April 2021 outside the TLP office in Saddar area of Lahore near Multan Road, a police team tried removing the members, leading to clashes and eleven police officers being injured. Protesters also attacked the police station in Nawan Kot, taking 12 policemen (in some reports said to be 11) as hostages and torturing them. They were released on the next day after talks with the Government of Punjab. The protesters also stole an oil tanker. Two of the protesters were killed and 50 were injured during the violence.

Attiq Ahmed, the public relations officer of Punjab Prisons said on 20 April that Saad Rizvi had been released. Lahore's Jail Superintendent Asad Warraich however said he didn't know of any such release and they had received no order to release him. Interior Minister Sheikh Rasheed Ahmad later confirmed that Rizvi had not been freed. He added that the government has freed 669 out of 733 people arrested in relation to the violent protests, 30 cars had been set on fire while five looted cars had been returned by protestors, and a National Assembly session had been called to decide on expulsion of the French ambassador.

TLP filed a review petition on 29 April addressed to the Interior Secretary, for the removal of the ban imposed on the party. A review board of the Lahore High Court rejected extending Saad's detention on 8 July, stating the government had no evidence to keep him in custody. His detention was however later extended by the government for 90 days under the Anti-Terrorism Act 1997.

Minister of Information and Broadcasting Fawad Chaudhry announced on 13 July that the Government of Pakistan had decided to keep the ban on TLP in place and it will ask the Election Commission of Pakistan (ECP) to cancel the party's election symbol. Despite the ban, the party was allowed to continue to take part in elections as it was not delisted by the ECP.

A review board of the Lahore High Court rejected extending Saad's detention on 8 July, stating the government had no evidence to keep him in custody. His detention was however later extended by the government for 90 days under the Anti-Terrorism Act 1997. A relative of Rizvi filed a petition before the Lahore High Court in September 2021, asking that the court declare the government's extension of his detention illegal and order his release.

TLP again held its protests in October 2021, following which the Government of Pakistan agreed to lift the ban on the party on 7 November and released Saad Rizvi on 18 November.

Acquittal and release of Asia Bibi 

Following the acquittal of Asia Bibi (formally, Asia Noreen), a Pakistani Christian who was charged with blasphemy and kept in solitary confinement for eight years until found innocent on 31 October 2018, Tehreek-e-Labbaik party members held protests across Pakistan that included  "blocking roads but not damaging the infrastructure". Muhammad Afzal Qadri, a TLP co-founder, also called for the death of the three Supreme Court justices involved in hearing Bibi's appeal, stating "The Chief Justice and two others deserve to be killed ... Either their security guards, their drivers, or their chefs should kill them."

On 2 November 2018, the Government of Pakistan under the administration of Imran Khan and the Tehreek-e-Labbaik political party, which encouraged the protests against Asia Bibi, came into an agreement that barred Asia Bibi from leaving the country, in addition to releasing Tehreek-e-Labbaik protesters who were under arrest. The deal includes expediting a motion in the court to place Asia Noreen on Pakistan's no fly list, known officially as the Exit Control List (ECL). Due to pressure from Tehreek-e-Labbaik, Pakistani authorities hadn't released Asia Noreen until the "Supreme Court makes a final review of its verdict" as "Ghulam Mustafa, the lawyer representing a provincial cleric in Punjab who had filed the initial blasphemy charges against Bibi, petitioned the Supreme Court requesting that the judges review her acquittal."

This agreement between the Government of Pakistan and Tehreek-e-Labbaik has led to "allegations [that] the government was capitulating to extremists". Pakistani Information Minister Fawad Chaudhry responded to these allegations, saying that "We had two options: either to use force, and when you use force people can be killed. That is not something a state should do... We tried negotiations and (in) negotiations you take something and you leave something." Asia Noreen's lawyer Saif-ul-Mulook called the agreement between the Government of Pakistan and the Islamists "painful", stating that "They cannot even implement an order of the country's highest court". Feeling that his life was threatened, Mulook fled to Europe in order "to stay alive as I still have to fight the legal battle for Asia Bibi." British Pakistani Christian Association chairman Wilson Chowdhry stated that "I am not surprised that Imran Khan's regime has caved in to extremists". Jemima Goldsmith, an ex-wife of Imran Khan, similarly "said that Pakistan's government caved in to extremist demands to bar Asia Bibi from leaving the country", opining "Not the Naya Pakistan we'd hoped for. 3 days after a defiant & brave speech defending the judiciary, Pakistan's gov caves in to extremist demands to bar Asia Bibi from leaving Pak, after she was acquitted of blasphemy- effectively signing her death warrant."

On 7 November 2018, Asia Bibi was released from New Jail for Women in Multan, flown to PAF Base Nur Khan, from whence she then departed the country on a charter plane, to the Netherlands. Shahbaz Attari of the Islamist political party Tehreek-e-Labbaik Pakistan (TLP), upon hearing the news, said that TLP members would gather in Islamabad and Rawalpindi to try and prevent the departure of Asia Bibi to the Netherlands.

Controversies

Khatm e Nabuwat Bill 

In October 2017, the government of Pakistan controversially changed the language in its 2017 elections bill. The Islamic Tehreek-e-Labbaik Pakistan and its leader Khadim Hussain Rizvi strongly opposed the new language, and demanded the resignation of Pakistan's Minister for Law and Justice Zahid Hamid, who had changed the law.

TLP held a large protest against the controversial amendment, stopping traffic at the Faizabad Interchange at first, which then led to further protests across the country. The party led a three-week sit-in protest that paralyzed the entire country including Pakistan's capital, Islamabad. At least six protesters were killed and 200 were injured when police unsuccessfully tried to disperse the sit-in, the protest had already spread out nationwide. Minister Zahid Hamid had to finally resign.

Assassination attempt 
In May 2018, Interior Minister Ahsan Iqbal was shot and wounded at a political rally in his home constituency of Narowal, in an apparent assassination attempt. He was airlifted from Narowal to Lahore for surgery where he was said to be in stable condition. The attacker, later found to be linked with Tehreek-e-Labaik, was arrested from the spot. TLP criticised the attack and called for a judicial inquiry, insisting that its methods were peaceful and democratic.

Extrajudicial killings 

In March 2019, a third year student at Bahawalpur's Government Sadiq Egerton College, Khateeb Hussain, stabbed associate professor Khalid Hameed in a fatal encounter. Khateeb Hussain was in contact with Zafar Gillani, a lawyer and senior member of the TLP prior to the murder, and obtained approval for the act over WhatsApp. The supposed motive for the killing was blasphemous and insulting rhetoric towards Islam.

In 2018, Sareer Ahmed, the principal of Islamia College in Charsadda, was murdered by a 17-year-old student who he had reprimanded for missing a number of classes. According to reports circulating on media channels, the student accused the professor of engaging in "blasphemy" for reprimanding him for skipping class to attend rallies held by the TLP.

Support for blasphemy-related attacks outside Pakistan 
In 2018, when the Dutch politician Geert Wilders announced that he was planning to hold a contest to draw caricatures of Muhammad, there were large protests in Pakistan against it. It was in this context that TLP leader Khadim Hussain Rizvi declared in front of media that he would order nuclear bomb strikes on the Netherlands to destroy the entire country and "wipe them off the map"  he was given the chance to or if he became Pakistan's leader. He is quoted to have said at a press conference in Karachi "If they give me the atom bomb I would remove Holland from the face of the earth before they can hold a competition of caricatures… I will wipe them off the face of this earth." Eventually Geert Wilders cancelled his proposed cartoon contest citing fears of security risks.

In late October 2020, just after the killing of French schoolteacher Samuel Paty in a suburb of Paris by an 18-year old Chechen refugee, TLP published an article on their official website where they commended the killing, labelling the killer as a "Shaheed" and "Mujahid" as well as posting a photo of the bloodied severed head of Samuel Paty in the same article on which the killer initially posted to Twitter just after the killing. The post was deleted by Twitter soon afterwards.

Political influence 

TLP has notably held protests against actions by the government deemed unjust and against the teachings of Islam. In 2018, world renowned Princeton economist, Atif Mian was initially chosen as a member of an Economic Advisory Council formed by Pakistani Prime Minister Imran Khan to provide assistance on issues of economics and finance. Since his appointment, the government faced criticism from groups opposed to government representation for religious minorities, prominently by the TLP under the guidance of Rizvi. because of Atif's affiliation with the Ahmadiyya faith. He was removed from the Economic Advisory Council on 7 September 2018 and afterwards council members Asim Ijaz Khwaja and Imran Rasul resigned in protest.

References

Barelvi political parties
Sunni Islamic movements
2015 establishments in Pakistan
Islamist groups
Political parties established in 2015
Islamic political parties in Pakistan
Blasphemy law in Pakistan
Far-right political parties in Pakistan
Tehreek-e-Labbaik Pakistan
Anti-Shi'ism
Organizations that oppose LGBT rights
Militant Sufi organisations